Bernardino Pérez Elizarán (21 May 1925 Hernani, Guipúzcoa – 21 October 2002 Valencia), commonly known as Pasieguito, was a Spanish football player and manager.

As a player, in an 18-year career, Pasieguito played at three clubs, including  multiple spells at Valencia CF. With Valencia he made 293 appearances overall and won the Copa del Rey in 1949 and 1954.

In a 22-year managerial career he managed four clubs, including Valencia over three distinct periods; he won the Copa del Rey in 1979 and the UEFA Super Cup in 1980. He was the most successful manager in the history of CE Sabadell: under his guidance, the Catalan club finished fourth in the 1968–69 La Liga and qualified for the 1969–70 Inter-Cities Fairs Cup, their only European appearance ever.

Honours

As player 
Valencia
 Copa del Rey: 1949, 1954
Copa Eva Duarte: 1949

As manager 
Valencia
 UEFA Super Cup: 1980
 Copa del Rey: 1979

References

External links
 
 
 Estadísticas generales con el Valencia CF at ciberche.net
 

1925 births
2002 deaths
Spanish football managers
Valencia CF players
Valencia CF managers
Levante UD footballers
Association football midfielders
Sporting de Gijón managers
Granada CF managers
Spanish footballers
Burgos CF footballers
CE Sabadell FC managers
Spain international footballers
People from Hernani
Sportspeople from Gipuzkoa
Real Sociedad footballers
Footballers from the Basque Country (autonomous community)